{{DISPLAYTITLE:C22H29N3O2}}
The molecular formula C22H29N3O2 (molar mass: 367.48 g/mol, exact mass: 367.2260 u) may refer to:

 O-1238
 18-Methylaminocoronaridine (18-MAC)

Molecular formulas